Syncopacma adenocarpella is a moth of the family Gelechiidae. It was described by Rebel in 1927. It is found on the Canary Islands.

The larvae feed on Adenocarpus complicatus aureus. They spin a tube of silk along a branch, and feed on the leaves from there. Pupation takes place inside the tube.

References

Moths described in 1927
Syncopacma